Tadaksahak (also Daoussahak, Dausahaq and other spellings, after the Tuareg name for its speakers, Dăwsăhak) is a Songhay language spoken by the pastoralist Idaksahak of the Gao Region of Mali. Its phonology, verb morphology and vocabulary has been strongly influenced by the neighbouring Tuareg languages, Tamasheq and Tamajaq.

Phonology

Vowels

Consonants

See also
Tadaksahak word list (Wiktionary)

References

Regula Christiansen, A grammar of Tadaksahak a northern Songhay language of Mali, Leiden University Centre for Linguistics (2010)
Niels and Regula Christiansen, Some verb morphology features of Tadaksahak, or, Berber or Songhay, this is the question, SIL Electronic Working Papers (2002)
Regula Christiansen and Stephen H. Levinsohn, Relative clauses in Tadasahak, SIL Electronic Working Papers (2003)
Michael J. Rueck and Niels Christiansen, Northern Songhay Languages in Mali and Niger: A Sociolinguistic Survey, Proceedings of the 1998 Nilo-Saharan Linguistics Conference (1998)

Languages of Mali
Songhay languages